Glyphipterix conosema is a species of sedge moth in the genus Glyphipterix. It was described by Edward Meyrick in 1913. It is found in Guyana.

References

Moths described in 1913
Glyphipterigidae
Moths of South America